Ana María Aurora García-Siñeriz Alonso (born 26 July 1965) is a Spanish TV presenter.

She has a bachelor's degree in journalism from the Universidad Complutense de Madrid and a master's degree in radio from Radio Nacional de España. She worked in Lo + plus and Magacine in Canal+. She was the presenter, along with Boris Izaguirre, of TV show Channel nº4, which aired on Cuatro from 2005 to 2008. She is married to Gauthier Peyrouzet and has two children: Mateo (b. 1997) and Chloe (b. 2000).

Television
Hablando claro (1988-1989) (TVE)
Primer plano (1993–1994) (Canal+)
Lo + plus (1995–2005) (Canal+)
Magacine (1996-2002) (Canal+)
Channel nº 4 (2005–2008) with  Boris Izaguirre (Cuatro)
Matinal Cuatro with a Daniel Serrano y Roger Persiva (2010) (Cuatro).

Bibliography
Bebé a bordo, 2000
Esas mujeres rubias, 2010
Nueve meses y un día, 2012

She has also published, along with illustrator Jordi Labanda, a series of children's storybooks centered on a character named Zoé.

References

External links
Ana García-Siñeriz in the IMDB
Ana García-Siñeriz and her beautiful feet

Spanish television presenters
Spanish women television presenters
People from Asturias
People from Oviedo
1965 births
Complutense University of Madrid alumni
Living people